James Raymond McBurney (June 3, 1933 – November 12, 2019) was a Canadian professional ice hockey left winger who played in one National Hockey League game for the Chicago Black Hawks during the 1952–53 NHL season.

See also
List of players who played only one game in the NHL

References

External links

1933 births
2019 deaths
Canadian ice hockey left wingers
Chicago Blackhawks players
Galt Black Hawks players
Sportspeople from Sault Ste. Marie, Ontario
Sault Ste. Marie Greyhounds players
Ice hockey people from Ontario